Archips subrufanus is a species of moth of the family Tortricidae. It is found in China (Heilongjiang, Jilin), Korea, Japan and Russia (Primorye).

The wingspan is about 11 mm. Adults are on wing from July to mid-September.

The larvae are probably polyphagous.

References

Moths described in 1883
Archips
Moths of Asia